The Permanent Electronic Duck Stamp Act of 2013 is a bill that was introduced into the United States House of Representatives during the 113th United States Congress.  The bill would authorize the United States Department of the Interior to issue electronic duck stamps as a form of Federal Duck Stamps.

Background
This Background section is primarily composed of information from the "Background and Need for Legislation" section of House Report 113-67, a public domain source.

On March 16, 1934, Congress passed the Migratory Bird Hunting Stamp Act. Under this law, every hunter over the age of 16 is required to purchase a Federal duck stamp each year to hunt migratory waterfowl. The price of a duck stamp has increased from $1 to the present cost of $15. Since the inception of the Federal Duck Stamp Program, the Fish and Wildlife Service (FWS) has collected more than $800 million from the sale of duck stamps. These monies, deposited in the Migratory Bird Conservation Fund, have been used to purchase or lease over 6 million acres of land at a total purchase price of over $1 billion for inclusion in the National Wildlife Refuge System. The Federal Duck Stamp Office has indicated that 98 percent of the dollars deposited in the Fund is used for wetland acquisition. The remaining 2 percent is spent on the printing and distribution of the stamps.

The duck stamp receipts have varied each year because of changes in waterfowl population levels, bag limits and economic 
conditions. The number of duck stamps sold has declined, however, from 2.5 million per year in 1971–1972 to 1.5 million stamps per 
year in 2011–2012. During that year, $22 million was deposited into the Migratory Bird Conservation Fund.

The Electronic Duck Stamp Act of 2006 directed the United States Secretary of the Interior to conduct a three-year pilot program that would allow up to 15 States to issue electronic Federal migratory bird hunting stamps. Those states that choose to  participate in the program were permitted to charge a reasonable fee to recover their administrative costs. In the past ten years, state electronic hunting and fishing licenses have become popular throughout the United States. They are easy to obtain because a potential hunter or angler can simply use his or her personal computer to access the appropriate state fish and wildlife department website and within a matter of moments are printing a document.

The electronic pilot program began in the 2007–2008 hunting year and is currently in its sixth year. There are currently eight 
states (Arkansas, Colorado, Florida, Idaho, Maryland, Minnesota, Texas and Wisconsin) where an individual can obtain a Federal 
duck stamp in an electronic form. Since its inception, more than 3.5 million stamps have been purchased in this manner. These 
stamps are valid for 45 days from the date of purchase.

Under Public Law 109–266, FWS is required to undertake a comprehensive evaluation of the pilot program to determine whether it has been cost-effective and a convenient means for issuing migratory bird hunting and conservation stamps. This report was submitted 
to Congress in August 2011 and concluded: ‘‘The E-Stamp Program has proven to be a practical method that is readily accepted by the stamp-buying public. The increased sale of E-Stamps, coupled with few complaints about the process through the three-year pilot, suggests customers are satisfied with this method of acquiring their Duck Stamps and the options available to them in their States.’’

The Permanent Electronic Duck Stamp Act of 2013 would permanently allow FWS to authorize certain states to sell the annual Federal Duck Stamp.

Provisions/Elements of the bill
This summary is based largely on the summary provided by the Congressional Research Service, a public domain source.

The Permanent Electronic Duck Stamp Act of 2013 would grant the United States Department of the Interior permanent authority to authorize any U.S. state to issue electronic duck stamps.  The bill then sets forth state electronic duck stamp application requirements.

Procedural history

House
The Permanent Electronic Duck Stamp Act of 2013 (H.R. 1206) was introduced to the House on March 14, 2013 by Rep. Rob Wittman (R-VA).  It was referred to the United States House Committee on Natural Resources and the United States House Natural Resources Subcommittee on Fisheries, Wildlife, Oceans and Insular Affairs.

On May 31, 2013, the House Majority Leader Eric Cantor announced that the Permanent Electronic Duck Stamp Act of 2013 was scheduled to be considered on the House floor under a suspension of the rules on June 3, 2013.  The vote took place as schedule and the bill passed 401-0 recorded in Roll Call vote 184.

On November 21, 2013, Rep. Robert E. Latta (R, OH-5) introduced the Sportsmen’s Heritage And Recreational Enhancement Act of 2013 (H.R. 3590; 113th Congress) into the House. The bill was an omnibus bill - a large bill that combines several smaller ones. The Permanent Electronic Duck Stamp Act of 2013 became Title V of the omnibus bill. The Sportsmen’s Heritage And Recreational Enhancement Act of 2013 passed the House on February 5, 2014.

Debate and discussion

See also
List of bills in the 113th United States Congress
Federal Duck Stamp

Notes/References

External links

Library of Congress - Thomas H.R. 1206
beta.congress.gov H.R. 1206
GovTrack.us H.R. 1206
OpenCongress.org H.R. 1206
WashingtonWatch.com H.R. 1206
House Report 113-67 on H.R. 1206
House Republicans' Statement on H.R. 1206

Acts of the 113th United States Congress